++ may refer to:

 checkmate, in chess notation
 the increment operator, in some programming languages
 much higher than normal, in some medical tests
 + +, an EP by South Korean girl group Loona